Roberto Tozzi (born 17 December 1958) was an Italian sprinter who specialized in the 400 metres.

Biography
He won a bronze medal in the 4 x 400 metres relay at the 1980 Summer Olympics, with teammates Stefano Malinverni, Mauro Zuliani and Pietro Mennea.

His personal best time is 46.03 seconds, achieved in September 1984 in Rieti.

Achievements

See also
Italy national relay team

References

External links
 

1958 births
Living people
Italian male sprinters
Athletes (track and field) at the 1980 Summer Olympics
Athletes (track and field) at the 1984 Summer Olympics
Olympic bronze medalists for Italy
Olympic athletes of Italy
Olympic bronze medalists in athletics (track and field)
Universiade medalists in athletics (track and field)
Mediterranean Games bronze medalists for Italy
Mediterranean Games medalists in athletics
Athletes (track and field) at the 1979 Mediterranean Games
Universiade bronze medalists for Italy
Medalists at the 1980 Summer Olympics
Medalists at the 1979 Summer Universiade